Doris scripta is a species of sea slug, a dorid nudibranch, a marine gastropod mollusc in the family Dorididae.

Distribution
This species was described from three specimens dredged off the Hongazi River, South Africa.

References

Dorididae
Gastropods described in 1907